The 2014 CIS Women's Ice Hockey Championship was held March 13–16, 2014, in Fredericton, New Brunswick, to determine a national champion for the 2013–14 CIS women's ice hockey season. The fifth-seeded McGill Martlets defeated the top-seeded Montréal Carabins in double overtime to win the fourth championship in program history.

Host
The tournament was played at the Grant Harvey Centre on the campus of St. Thomas University (STU) in Fredericton, New Brunswick. It was the first championship to be hosted by St. Thomas and marked the first appearance for the Tommies in the national tournament.

Seedings
Six CIS teams qualified for the tournament and were divided into two pools to play a round-robin tournament to determine the two teams who would play in the championship game. The winner of Pool A played the winner of Pool B in the gold medal game.

Pool A

Pool B

Game summaries

CIS Medal round

5th-place game

Bronze-medal game

Gold-medal game

Final results

References

External links
 Tournament Web Site

U Sports women's ice hockey
Ice hockey competitions in New Brunswick
2013–14 in Canadian ice hockey
Sport in Fredericton
2014 in New Brunswick